Necula is a Romanian surname. Notable people with the name include:

Cătălin Necula (born 1969), a Romanian footballer
George Necula, a Romanian computer scientist
Iulia Necula (born 1986), a Romanian table tennis player
Răducanu Necula (born 1946), a Romanian footballer
Veronica Necula (born 1967), a Romanian rower

See also
Tricentra necula, a species of moth

Romanian-language surnames